The Mosslands School is a comprehensive, community school for boys aged 11–18. It is situated in Wallasey Village, Wirral, England. It is a STEAM Centre of Excellence and became a specialist Technology College in 2004.

The school has 1097 pupils of whom 159 are in the sixth form. The school is rare in that it is a single-sex comprehensive school. Whilst Mosslands is a boys school, it accepts girls in the sixth form. Ofsted rated the school as Good in 2016.

History
The Mosslands School began on 18 July 1908 as the Higher Elementary School. The school building, located at Dalmorton Road, New Brighton, was officially opened by The Right Hon. Augustine Birrell KC (Secretary of State for Ireland and formerly Education). The school opened on 11 August 1908 with 7 staff and 153 boys with Mr William Charles Simeon Jones as Principal. The first school inspection took place in 1910 and the recommendation was made for larger premises to accommodate the growth of the local population.

In 1920 the school moved to Coronation Avenue, Wallasey, and was renamed Wallasey Boys Central School. It was one of the few Technical Schools established after the Education Act 1944.

In 1956 a purpose-built school was built at Mosslands Drive, Wallasey Village. The building, plate glass in construction, was opened by glass mogul Sir Harry Pilkington. The school was renamed the Secondary Technical School for Boys.

By 1959 the school population was around 500 with 20 members of staff. The school was established as the only Technical Grammar School in the country. In 1961 J D Petit became headmaster and the house system was introduced.

The school took on the Middle School system and changed its name for the fourth time to Mosslands Senior Comprehensive. New headmaster William Mitchell later reorganised the school to 11 to 18 and it became known as The Mosslands School.

The school occupied two sites (Mosslands Drive and a lower school annexe for years 7 and 8) with a population of 1250 boys, a mixed sixth form and over 100 members of staff. Headmaster Mr Gordon Fair took the school to a single site and a large rebuild took place, equipping the school with science laboratories, art studios, music suites, computer rooms, sports hall, and a library.

In 2004 The Mosslands School became a specialist Technology College.

House system
Pupils at Mosslands are sorted into one of three school houses. The houses are eponymously named Faraday, Grenfell and Ruskin after Michael Faraday, Sir Wilfred Grenfell and John Ruskin respectively.

Notable old boys

 Shaun Garnett (b 1969), footballer for Tranmere Rovers and Oldham Athletic
 Paul Hollywood (b 1966), Baker and celebrity television chef known for The Great British Bake Off
Jason Koumas (b 1979), professional footballer for Wigan Athletic, Wales
 Nigel Lythgoe (b 1949), television and film director noted for producing Pop Idol and American Idol
 Derek Mountfield (b 1962), professional footballer for Aston Villa and Everton
 Simon Rimmer (b 1963), celebrity television chef who co-presented BBC2's Something for the Weekend
 Matthew Smith (b 1966), creator of the 8-bit platform games Manic Miner and Jet Set Willy
 Jay Spearing (b 1988), professional footballer for Tranmere Rovers

References

Secondary schools in the Metropolitan Borough of Wirral
Educational institutions established in 1956
1956 establishments in England
Wallasey
Community schools in the Metropolitan Borough of Wirral